Aimeraude Muyenga Mawanda (born 25 March 1998) is a DR Congolese footballer who plays as a defender for TP Mazembe and the DR Congo women's national team.

Club career
Mawanda has played for FCF Attaque Sans Recul and TP Mazembe in the Democratic Republic of the Congo.

International career
Mawanda made her senior debut for the DR Congo on 25 March 2021 in a 4–0 friendly home win over Congo.

International goals
Scores and results list DR Congo goal tally first.

See also
 List of Democratic Republic of the Congo women's international footballers

References

External links

1998 births
Living people
Democratic Republic of the Congo women's footballers
Women's association football defenders
TP Mazembe players
Democratic Republic of the Congo women's international footballers